The Paris Peace Agreements, officially the Comprehensive Cambodian Peace Agreements, were signed on 23 October 1991 and marked the official end of the Cambodian–Vietnamese War and the Third Indochina War. The agreement led to the deployment of the first peacekeeping mission (the United Nations Transitional Authority in Cambodia) since the Cold War and the first occasion in which the United Nations took over as the government of a state. The agreement was signed by nineteen countries.

The Paris Peace Agreements were the following conventions and treaties:

 The Final Act of the Paris Conference on Cambodia
 Agreement on the Political Settlement of the Cambodia Conflict
 Agreement Concerning the Sovereignty, Territorial Integrity and Inviolability, Neutrality and National Unity of Cambodia
 Declaration on the Rehabilitation and Reconstruction of Cambodia

References

External links
 Cambodia Information Center, Paris Peace Accord
 U.S. Institute of Peace, Peace Agreements Digital Collection
 UNTAC website
Cambodia-1991 Paris Peace  Agreements

Peace treaties
Cambodia–Vietnam relations
Treaties of the State of Cambodia
Treaties of Vietnam
Treaties concluded in 1991
Treaties entered into force in 1991
Treaties entered into by the United Nations
1991 in Cambodia
1991 in France
1991 in Vietnam
Aftermath of war
Treaties of Australia
Treaties of Brunei
Treaties of Cambodia
Treaties of Canada
Treaties of the People's Republic of China
Treaties of France
Treaties of India
Treaties of Indonesia
Treaties of Japan
Treaties of Laos
Treaties of Malaysia
Treaties of the Philippines
Treaties of the Soviet Union
Treaties of Singapore
Treaties of Thailand
Treaties of the United Kingdom
Treaties of the United States